The 1879 United States Senate election in Pennsylvania was held on January 20, 1879. J. Donald Cameron was re-elected by the Pennsylvania General Assembly to the United States Senate.

Background
After Sen. Simon Cameron resigned from office, his son J. Donald Cameron was elected by the General Assembly, consisting of the House of Representatives and the Senate, in 1877 to serve the remainder of the unexpired term, which was to expire on March 4, 1879.

Results
The Pennsylvania General Assembly convened on January 20, 1879, to elect a Senator to serve the term beginning on March 4, 1879. The results of the vote of both houses combined are as follows:

|-
|-bgcolor="#EEEEEE"
| colspan="3" align="right" | Totals
| align="right" | 251
| align="right" | 100.00%
|}

See also 
 United States Senate elections, 1878 and 1879

References

External links
Pennsylvania Election Statistics: 1682-2006 from the Wilkes University Election Statistics Project

1879
Pennsylvania
United States Senate